Xinjiang Medical University (XMU), formerly the Xinjiang Medical College, is a medical university in Ürümqi, the capital of the Xinjiang Uyghur Autonomous Region of the People's Republic of China. It was ratified by the National Ministry of Education in 1998 and entitled by Jiang Zemin.

The curriculum places a particular emphasis on medicine, management and linguistics, with the university facilitating 25 specialties for undergraduate students and 17 specialties for academic education. Over 50,000 students have been educated at XMU. In 2010, 13,100 students were enrolled at the university, with 5,405 people employed in teaching positions.

XMU is at the base of Carp Hill in Northeast Ürümqi and consists of a campus that is over 3 million square feet.

History

Chairman Mao Zedong and Premier Zhou Enlai ordered the Ministry of Health to work with the Soviet Union Ministry of Foreign Affairs to build a new medical centre in Xinjiang city of Dihua (now the city of Ürümqi). The decision was based upon instructions provided by Saifuddin Azizi.

XMU was founded by incorporating the Traditional Chinese Medicine College of Xinjiang Medical University with the Xinjiang Medical College. Before incorporation, Xinjiang Medical College was amongst 156 key projects aided by the former Soviet Union during the First Five-Year Plan and began recruiting new students in 1956. During its 60 years of existence, XMU has received attention from national and international leaders, including Chinese Communist Party officials and other provincial and urban figures across China.

Seal

The seal of Xinjiang Medical University was created in 1956 and certifies official paper work issued by staff. Use of the seal is overseen by the administration of the university, and its security is governed by the university's constitution.

Structure and composition 
Presently, XMU comprises eight medical and allied colleges: the Medical College, Public Health College, Traditional Medicine College, Basic Medical Sciences College, Pharmacy College, Nurses Training College, Continuing Education College, and Vocational College.

XMU students can attain the Doctor of Medicine (MD) degree after successful completion of a seven-year course.

Xinjiang Medical University is affiliated with all hospitals in the region and, as of 2010, manages 40 clinical positions throughout these centres. The foremost affiliated hospital facilitates clinical teaching, internship placements for PhD students, a seven-year training program for postgraduate students and supervision of international students.

Faculty

In 2010, the teaching faculty consisted of 1163 professors and assistant professors, and 4290 employees in other roles. The university has instituted 400 supervisory positions for doctorate and masters students.

Campus
The campus has a number of buildings from the late Russian era in Xinjiang. Xinjiang Medical University campus has been completely updated and modernized and a library, canteens, hospitals and training centres are included facilities. The experimental laboratories include modern bioinformation processing systems and models.
The new campus of Xinjiang Medical University is expected to start in 2020. The total building area of the two new medical buildings is approximately 134,838 square meters, with a total cost of 390.5 million yuan ($56.25 million).
The new campus covers an area of 126.67 hectares, with a total floor area of 739,000 square meters and a total investment of 4.08 billion yuan, which can accommodate about 24,000 teachers and students.

Library

In 1995, the university built a new library building which now covers 16,000 m2 and has over 1.07 million books. There are more than 1,300 periodicals and journals available in Chinese and other languages. Six book databases have been introduced and there is a connection to Partners Harvard Medical International's library database. The library seats more than 2500 in the readers area and over 350 in the electronic library access area.

Every floor has a central area of reading for daily readers; the fifth and sixth floors have dedicated thesis areas for doctoral students.

International Education College in English Medium 

The International Education College of the Xinjiang Medical University has recruited medical students since 1982. As of December 2018, more than 700 international students were studying at the college, both undergraduate and postgraduate, and there were over 450 faculty members.  Career Counseling Education Consultancy is the Official partner to recruit international students in this university from Pakistan, Bangladesh, Gulf countries and some African countries.

In January 2009, the Government of the People's Republic of China announced a scholarship program that seeks to award students who perform well in the Faculty of Sciences (FSc) Pre-Medical degree. The students are required to study clinical medicine in Chinese for six years, and a passing score on the HSK band 3 (or above) is to be attained by scholarship holders within one year of admission.

Subject arrangement
During the first two years of study, the curriculum includes basic theoretical subjects, such as anatomy, physiology, histology, embryology, biochemistry, and organic and inorganic chemistry. Clinical subjects, which begin in the third year, include gynecology, surgery, internal medicine, pediatrics, E.N.T., neurology, dermatology and psychiatry.

College administration

As of 2012, the Party Secretary of Xinjiang Medical University is Li Bin, whilst Muhammad Yasen is the president.

Affiliations and accreditations

Achievements 
Since 1998, XMU has won 58 provincial and ministerial level scientific research awards. It is listed among the top colleges and universities performing scientific research in the Autonomous Region. It is the only institution in China to win the "Chinese Medical Academic Award" in four consecutive years. XMU topped the universities that were being observed by the National Natural Science Foundation of China.

As of 22 July 2009, the university was one of seven such institutions in the republic to be recognized by the Pakistan Medical & Dental Council (this was in addition to recognition already granted by the Medical Council of India).

Ranking
 World Rank 2944 as on 24.04.2020
 First among medical universities in Xinjiang, People's Republic of China
 Holds 37th position among "Top Chinese Universities in Medicine, 2011"
 49th position in China Medical Universities Rankings 2012, an annual list of China's top universities by China University Assessment
 388th position in China overall, ranking by Webometrics Ranking of World Universities
 236th university in China overall, having a score of 20.00

See also 
 List of universities in Xinjiang

References

External links 

 

 
Universities in China with English-medium medical schools
Universities and colleges in Xinjiang
Educational institutions established in 1956
Education in Ürümqi
Medical schools in China
1956 establishments in China